Faraz Farooqui is a Pakistani actor and model. He is known for his roles in Khalish, Dil-e-Bereham, Meri Ladli, Qismat Ka Likha, Ishq Hai, Bharosa Pyar Tera and Malaal-e-Yaar.

Early life 
Faraz took part in reality dance competition called Nachle that was judged by Faysal Quraishi, Reshma and Noor. Then his brother Hammad was selected but he didn't pass and then he worked as an educationist.

Career 
In 2012 he made his debut as an actor in drama Meri Ladli. He appeared in dramas Mere Baba Ki Ounchi Haveli, Besharam, Malkin and Lamhay. Then he appeared in dramas Kabhi Band Kabhi Baja, Khalish, Qismat Ka Likha, Dil-e-Bereham and Malaal-e-Yaar. Since then he appeared in dramas Bharosa Pyar Tera, Sotan, Ishq Hai, Oye Motti Season 2, Dil-e-Veeran and Samjhota.

Personal life 
Faraz married Shiza Khan in 2016 and they have two children together a son and daughter. Faraz older twin brother Hammad is also an actor.

Filmography

Television

Telefilm

Web series

References

External links 
 
 

1989 births
Living people
21st-century Pakistani male actors
Pakistani male television actors